Nicah is a village in the Pidie Regency, in the Atjeh province of Indonesia. This village has a population of 314 according to the 2010 census. Nicah is the town in the country's capital city North West Jakarta and is around 1,053 mi (or 1,694 km) long.

References

 Census Results (2010), Badan Pusat Statistics, Population_of_Indonesia_by_Village
Nicah